Bogert's rock gecko (Afroedura bogerti) is a species of lizard in the family Gekkonidae. The species is native to southern Africa.

Etymology
The specific name, bogerti, is in honor of American herpetologist Charles Mitchill Bogert.

Geographic range
A. bogerti is found in Angola and Namibia.

Habitat

Description
Dorsally, the body is gray, with darker irregularly shaped crossbars. Ventrally it is white, speckled with brown.

Reproduction
A. bogerti is oviparous.

References

Further reading
Branch WR, Haacke W, Vaz Pinto P, Conradie W, Baptista N, Verburgt L, Verisimmo L (2017). "Loveridge's Angolan geckos, Afroedura karroica bogerti and Pachydactylus scutatus angolensis (Sauria, Gekkonidae): new distribution records, comments on type localities and taxonomic status". Zoosystematics and Evolution 93 (1): 157–166. (in English, with an abstract in Portuguese).
Branch WR, Schmitz A, Lobón-Rovira J, Baptista NL, António T, Conradie W (2021). "Rock Island melody: A revision of the Afroedura bogerti Loveridge, 1944 group, with descriptions of four new endemic species from Angola". Zoosystematics and Evolution 97 (1): 55–82. (in English, with an abstract in Portuguese).
Loveridge A (1944). "New Geckos of the Genera Afroedura, New Genus, and Pachydactylus from Angola". American Museum Novitates (1254): 1–4. (Afroedura karroica bogerti, new subspecies, pp. 1–3, Figure 1).
Rösler H (2000). "Kommentierte Liste der rezent, subrezent, und fossil bekannten Geckotaxa (Reptilia: Gekkonomorpha)". Gekkota 2: 28–153. (Afroedura bogerti'', p. 57). (in German).

bogerti
Reptiles of Angola
Reptiles of South Africa
Taxa named by Arthur Loveridge
Reptiles described in 1944